Alexandrovka is a rural locality (a selo) in Alexandrovsky Selsoviet of Znamensky District of Tambov Oblast, Russia.

The village was founded in 1816 when sisters Zagryazhskys, landed estate owners, moved 366 serfs to this location from  their votchina in Znamenka.

References

Sources

Rural localities in Tambov Oblast
Populated places established in 1816
1816 establishments in the Russian Empire